Bobby's War is a 1974 Norwegian drama film directed by Arnljot Berg. It was entered into the 24th Berlin International Film Festival.

Cast
 Erik Andersson – Bobby Lund
 Roy Bjørnstad – Robert Lund
  – Hjemmefrontsmann
 Eilif Armand – Tusseladden
 Urda Arneberg – Serveringsdame
 Carsten Byhring – Hirdmann
 Geir Børresen – Lærer
 Bente Børsum – Fru Lund
  – Werner

References

External links

1974 films
1970s Norwegian-language films
1974 drama films
Films directed by Arnljot Berg
Norwegian drama films